Chelatococcus sambhunathii is a gram-negative, aerobic catalase- and oxidase-positive motile bacteria with a single polar flagellum from the genus of Chelatococcus which was isolated from sediment of a hot sulfur spring in Orissa in India.

References

External links
Type strain of Chelatococcus sambhunathii at BacDive -  the Bacterial Diversity Metadatabase

Hyphomicrobiales
Bacteria described in 2010